The Speed Demon is a 1925 American silent sports action film directed by Robert N. Bradbury and starring Kenneth MacDonald, Peggy Montgomery and Clark Comstock.

Cast
 Kenneth MacDonald as 	Speed Sherman
 Peggy Montgomery as Enid Warren
 Wayne Lamont as Joe Blake 
 Art Manning as Ed Norton
 Clark Comstock as Col. Warren
 Jack P. Pierce as Pickles Rankin 
 Frank Rice as Col. Warren's butler
 Barney Oldfield as 	Barney Oldfield

References

Bibliography
 Connelly, Robert B. The Silents: Silent Feature Films, 1910-36, Volume 40, Issue 2. December Press, 1998.
 Munden, Kenneth White. The American Film Institute Catalog of Motion Pictures Produced in the United States, Part 1. University of California Press, 1997.

External links
 

1925 films
1920s sports films
1920s English-language films
American silent feature films
American auto racing films
Films directed by Robert N. Bradbury
American black-and-white films
1920s American films
Silent sports films